My Special Tatay is a 2018 Philippine television drama series starring Ken Chan, Lilet, Candy Pangilinan and Arra San Agustin. The series premiered on GMA Network's Afternoon Prime block and worldwide on GMA Pinoy TV from September 3, 2018 to March 29, 2019, replacing Hindi Ko Kayang Iwan Ka.

NUTAM (Nationwide Urban Television Audience Measurement) People in Television Homes ratings are provided by AGB Nielsen Philippines. The series ended, but its the 30th-week run, and with 150 episodes. It was replaced by Inagaw na Bituin.

Series overview

Episodes

September 2018

October 2018

November 2018

December 2018

January 2019

February 2019

March 2019

References

Lists of Philippine drama television series episodes